Sir Edgar Charles Beck CBE (11 May 1911 – 29 July 2000) was a British civil engineer. He was managing director, chairman then president of Mowlem, one of the largest construction and civil engineering companies in the United Kingdom.

He was educated at Lancing College and then Jesus College, Cambridge before joining Mowlem in 1933. During World War II he helped with the construction of 10 airfields, and the Mulberry harbours used during the D-Day landings.

During Beck's chairmanship of Mowlem, the company reconstructed the 18th-century building at 10 Downing Street (1963), built the new London Bridge (1967), and built the NatWest Tower (1979, now Tower 42).

Beck was chairman of the Export Group for the Constructional Industries (1959–1963), and Chairman of the Council, then President, of the Federation of Civil Engineering Contractors. He was appointed a CBE in 1967 and was knighted in 1975.

Edgar Beck died in July 2000 and was survived by his wife, three sons and two daughters.

References

Sir Edgar Beck: Obituary The Independent, 14 September 2000
Sir Edgar Beck: Obituary The Daily Telegraph, 23 August 2001

External links

1911 births
2000 deaths
People from the London Borough of Hackney
People educated at Lancing College
Alumni of Jesus College, Cambridge
Commanders of the Order of the British Empire
Knights Bachelor
20th-century British businesspeople
British civil engineers
Businesspeople awarded knighthoods